Leonora Lim-Moore is a British film actress, writer and director, known for her lead role as Nikita in The Taiwan Oyster (2012), directed by Mark Jarrett and for her directorial debut "East", in which she also starred as 'Elva', and which won Best Feature Film at the UK Film Festival in December 2011.

In 2015, her second co-directed feature film "Made In Taiwan", filmed in Taipei, Taiwan, and starring Alexander Jeremy, Ester Yang and Mason Lee, won 5 awards, including Best UK Film at the Manchester International Film Festival 2016.

Background
Lim-Moore was accepted to The University of Oxford (Wadham College) to read a four-year Masters Degree in Astrophysics and Particle Physics. She lived in Japan for several years and traveled to Los Angeles to receive acting training before returning to England to focus on her acting. Together with her brother, Jonny Moore, she co-directed 'Hear The Doors', a feature film that explores the ideas and mysteries of the Universe through the eyes of a 5-yr old boy.

Career
In 2009, Leonora performed in theatre works The Sister's Walk, Tell Me, DMV Tyrant, Shampoo, and Stop Kiss for Black Box Theatre.

For her first effort as a filmmaker, Leonora was writer, director, producer, and composer of the feature film East (2011). It subsequently won 'Best Feature Film' at the 2011 UK Film Festival.

Filmography
As actress
 I Have A Bad Feeling About This (2014)
 Brothers' Day [TAIWAN] (2014)
 Surviving Alba (2013)
 The Taiwan Oyster [TAIWAN] (2012)
 East (2011) as Elva
 Welcome to Minou [JAPAN] (2009) as Geisha

As filmmaker
 East (2011)
 Hear The Doors (2013)

Recognition
Twitch Film made note of Moore's performance in The Taiwan Oyster, and wrote that the onscreen chemistry between Billy Harvey and Leonora Lim-Moore "is at times breathtaking". Also toward that film, Don Clinchy of the Slackerwood website wrote that Moore did "a great job as Nikita, a smart, savvy woman who is a sober, grounding influence on her intemperate traveling companions."

Awards and nominations
 2011, won 'Best Feature Film' at UK Film Festival for East (2011)

References

External links

 

Living people
British actresses
British filmmakers
Year of birth missing (living people)